Center Township is one of twelve townships in Emmet County, Iowa, United States.  As of the 2000 census, its population was 459.

History
Center Township was created in 1876. It was named from its central location.

Geography
According to the United States Census Bureau, Center Township covers an area of 36.45 square miles (94.41 square kilometers); of this, 36.03 square miles (93.32 square kilometers, 98.85 percent) is land and 0.42 square miles (1.09 square kilometers, 1.15 percent) is water.

Cities, towns, villages
 Gruver

Adjacent townships
 Ellsworth Township (north)
 Lincoln Township (northeast)
 Swan Lake Township (east)
 Jack Creek Township (southeast)
 High Lake Township (south)
 Twelve Mile Lake Township (southwest)
 Estherville Township (west)
 Emmet Township (northwest)

Cemeteries
The township contains Swan Lake Village Cemetery.

Major highways
  Iowa Highway 9

Airports and landing strips
 Estherville Municipal Airport

School districts
 Estherville Lincoln Central Community School District

Political districts
 Iowa's 4th congressional district
 State House District 7
 State Senate District 4

References
 United States Census Bureau 2008 TIGER/Line Shapefiles
 United States Board on Geographic Names (GNIS)
 United States National Atlas

External links
 US-Counties.com
 City-Data.com

Townships in Emmet County, Iowa
Townships in Iowa